God Said Ha! is a 1998 filmed performance of Julia Sweeney's one-woman play of the same. Written and directed by Sweeney, the film premiered at the South by Southwest Film Festival on March 14, 1998. The play focuses on Sweeney's recollections of when her brother was diagnosed with cancer.

Synopsis
The film is a monologue based on Sweeney's one woman stage show of the same name where Sweeney discusses her memories of her brother Michael getting diagnosed with lymphoma and her own personal experiences when she discovered that she also had cancer.

Cast
 Julia Sweeney as herself
 Quentin Tarantino as himself

Reception
Critical reception for God Said Ha! has been predominantly positive. On Rotten Tomatoes the film holds a rating of 86% based on 22 reviews. The site's consensus states: "God Said, Ha! plumbs poignant depths, but Julia Sweeney's sharp, graceful wit makes this one-woman monologue a wise, big-hearted burst of uplifting -- and perhaps therapeutic -- entertainment."

Awards
 Golden Space Needle for Best Film at the Seattle International Film Festival (1998, won)
 Audience Award at the New York Comedy Festival (1998, won)

References

External links
 

Stand-up comedy concert films
1998 films
1998 comedy films
Films scored by Anthony Marinelli
1990s English-language films